Parliamentary elections were held in Bulgaria on 5 July 2009. With 40% of the vote, the decisive winner of the elections was the established in 2006 personalistic party of Boyko Borisov, GERB. The Socialist Party, in power before the election, was in second place, with around 18%. Оnce-ruling National Movement Simeon II did not cross the 4% threshold and won no seats. The turnout was 60.6%, one of the lowest ever. Following the election, GERB leader Boyko Borisov became Prime Minister. Just like all the previous parliamentary elections since the fall of communism, the government was not re-elected.

Background
The 2009 elections saw the debut of a parallel voting system with a lesser plurality vote element. 209 of the 240 parliament seats were distributed according to the proportional system, while the remaining 31 (the number of voting constituencies in Bulgaria) were allocated for First Past the Post.

The ruling Bulgarian Socialist Party wanted to amend the electoral law, increasing state subsidies for political parties threefold (the reason for doing this would be making campaign financing more transparent, they claim), requiring registration in at least two-thirds of all electoral districts (thus eliminating most marginal parties).

An electoral reform was passed in April 2009 with the votes of the BSP, the DPS, Ataka and Order, Law and Justice. It would raise the election threshold for alliances from 4% to 8% (which was widely seen as a move against the opposition electoral alliance of DSB and SDS, which was polling around 7.3% at that time) and established that 31 of the 240 seats would be elected by majority vote. President Georgi Parvanov returned the law to parliament for reconsideration, but as the parties had no plans to amend it and as he could only return the law once, he had to sign it before the election. After the law had been passed, the provision raising the electoral threshold was struck down by the Constitutional Court of Bulgaria.

The Blue Coalition was denied registration for the election by the Central Election Commission on 28 May 2009 due to a leadership struggle in the SDS, one of the two constituent parties. The Blue Coalition announced it would appeal the ruling. On 29 May 2009, the Supreme Administrative Court overturned the CEC's decision, allowing the Blue Coalition to contest the election.

Participating parties
Parties standing in the election included:
 Order, Law and Justice (Ред, Законност, Справедливост)
 Lider (Лидер)
 GERB (ГЕРБ)
 Movement for Rights and Freedoms (ДПС)
 Attack (Атака)
 Coalition for Bulgaria (led by the Bulgarian Socialist Party) (Коалиция за България)
 Union of the Patriotic Forces "Defense" (Съюз на Патриотичните Сили "Защита")
 National Movement for Stability and Progress (formerly the National Movement Simeon II) (НДСВ)
 Coalition BANU (Коалиция БЗНС)(disqualified from the election)
 Bulgarian Left Coalition (Българска Лява Коалиция)
 Party of the Liberal Alternative and Peace (Партия на Либералната Алтернатива и Мира (ПЛАМ))
 The Greens (ПП Зелените)
 Social Democrats (Социалдемократи)
 Internal Macedonian Revolutionary Organization – Bulgarian National Movement (ВМРО – Българско Национално Движение)(disqualified from the election)
 The Other Bulgaria (ПП Другата България)
 Union of the Bulgarian Patriots (Обединение на Българските Патриоти)
 National Movement for the Salvation of the Fatherland (Политическа партия "Национално движение за спасение на Отечеството")
 Bulgarian National Union – New Democracy (Български Национален Съюз – НД)
 Blue Coalition (Синята Коалиция)
 For the Homeland (За Родината – ДГИ-НЛ)

Opinion polls
The following are the polls for the proportional vote:

Results

The following members were elected through first past the post voting in 31 single-member constituencies:

Aftermath
The elections were decisively won by Boyko Borisov's GERB party, which gained 39.72% of the proportional vote and 26 of the 31 majority vote parliament seats, in total 116 and almost half of the Assembly's 240 seats. Until the elections Borisov was Mayor of Sofia and left office to become Prime Minister, until 2005 he was a member of the former king Simeon II's National Movement for Stability and Progress party and before he was also a member of the Communist Party, though he and his party's policy are opposite to the Communist. The ruling Bulgarian Socialist Party-headed Coalition for Bulgaria gathered 17.70% but no majority vote seats. The Muslim minority's party Movement for Rights and Freedoms amassed 14.45% and won the remaining five majority vote seats, the nationalist party Attack came fourth with 9.36% of the proportional vote, followed by the right-wing Blue Coalition of former ruling elements with 6.76% and the newly Order, Law and Justice, whose tally was at 4.13%. Parties such as Lider and Saxe-Coburg Gotha's once-ruling NDSV did not cross the 4% threshold and won no seats. The voter turnout of 60.20% was perceived as high, but was not unexpected.

As a result of the election, the government was formed by GERB alone with Boyko Borisov as Prime Minister. BSP and DPS, two of the members of the former centre-left ruling coalition, were put in opposition. Due to the party's failure in the elections, not electing a single member of parliament, former Tsar and more recently Prime Minister resigned as NDSV leader on 6 July. While Prime Minister Sergei Stanishev took the responsibility for the socialists' electoral failure, he did not resign as party leader and continued to lead the party in opposition through to the next election.

See also
List of political parties in Bulgaria
List of Bulgarian constituencies

References

External links
NSD: European Election Database - Bulgaria publishes regional level election data; allows for comparisons of election results, 1990-2009

Bulgaria
Parliamentary
Parliamentary elections in Bulgaria